San Piero Patti (Sicilian: San Pieru Patti) is a comune (municipality) in the Metropolitan City of Messina in the Italian region Sicily, located about  east of Palermo and about  southwest of Messina.

San Piero Patti borders the following municipalities: Patti, Raccuja, Sant'Angelo di Brolo, Librizzi, Montalbano Elicona.

History 
San Piero Patti was conquered and inhabited by the Arabs until the 11th Century, when they were defeated by Roger I of Sicily.

Main sights

 Church of Santa Maria - church built in 1566; contains  16th century frescos
 Convent of Carmelitani Calzati, a convent built in 1566; features  a cloister with Renaissance decorations 
 Museo dei Vangeli e del Verbo Umanato, a religious museum containing a collection of vestments, sacred painting and artifacts
 Mother Church, built in the second half of the 14th century

People
Helle Busacca, poet
Emilio Fede, journalist
Pete Rugolo, jazz musician

References

External links
 Official website

Cities and towns in Sicily